I Will Always Love You and Other Greatest Hits is a 1996 Dolly Parton compilation which Columbia Records put together as Parton was leaving the label.  The compilation included material from five of her eight CBS albums.

Track listing
 "Why'd You Come in Here Lookin' Like That" (Bob Carlisle, Randy Thomas) – 2:32
 "Yellow Roses" (Dolly Parton) – 3:55
 "White Limozeen" (Mac Davis, D. Parton) – 4:17
 "Eagle When She Flies" (D. Parton) – 3:10
 "Romeo" (D. Parton) – 3:33
 "Rockin' Years" (Floyd Parton) – 3:24
 duet with Ricky Van Shelton
 "To Daddy" (D. Parton) – 2:41
 "Silver and Gold" (Carl Perkins, Greg Perkins, Stan Perkins) – 3:50
 "He's Alive" (Don Francisco) – 4:37
 "I Will Always Love You" (D. Parton) – 3:17
 duet with Vince Gill

Tracks 1,2,3 & 9 are from the 1989 studio album White Limozeen
Tracks 4,6 & 8 are from the 1991 studio album Eagle When She Flies
Track 5 is from the 1993 studio album Slow Dancing With the Moon
Track 7 is from the 1995 compilation album I Will Always Love You/The Essential Dolly Parton One
Track 10 is from the 1995 studio album Something Special

Chart performance

References

1996 greatest hits albums
Dolly Parton compilation albums
Columbia Records compilation albums